The Irish League in season 2002–03 comprised two divisions, one of 12 teams and one of 8, and Glentoran won the championship.

Premier Division

League standings

Results

Matches 1–22
During matches 1–22 each team plays every other team twice (home and away).

Matches 23–33
During matches 23–33 each team will play every other team for the third time (either at home, or away).

Matches 34–38 
During matches 34–38 each team will play every other team in their half of the table once. As this is the fourth time that teams play each other this season, home sides are chosen so that they will have played each other twice at home and twice away.

Section A

Section B

First Division

League standings

References
Northern Ireland - List of final tables (RSSSF)

NIFL Premiership seasons
1
Northern